Nausea is the sensation of unease and discomfort in the stomach with an urge to vomit. 

Nausea may also refer to:

 Nausea (band), an American crust punk band
 Nausea (novel) (La Nausée), a 1938 novel by Jean-Paul Sartre
 Nausea (Beck song), 2006
 Nausea (Jeff Rosenstock song), 2015
 "Nausea", a song by X on Los Angeles (X album)
 "Nausea", a song by Therapy? from their Nurse (album)
 "Nausea", a song by Hellyeah from their Hellyeah (album)

See also
Ad nauseam